German submarine U-101 was a Type VIIB U-boat of Nazi Germany's Kriegsmarine during World War II. She had a highly successful career.

Design
German Type VIIB submarines were preceded by the shorter Type VIIA submarines. U-101 had a displacement of  when at the surface and  while submerged. She had two shafts and two  propellers.

U-101 was fitted with five  torpedo tubes (four fitted at the bow and one at the stern), fourteen torpedoes, one  SK C/35 naval gun, 220 rounds, and one  anti-aircraft gun The boat had a complement of between forty-four and sixty.

Service history
U-101 was ordered on 15 December 1937 and laid down on 31 March 1939 at Germaniawerft, Kiel, as yard number 595. She was launched on 13 January 1940 and commissioned under her first commander Kapitänleutnant Fritz Frauenheim on 23 September of that year. Frauenheim commanded her for her work-up with the 7th U-boat Flotilla between 11 March and 18 November 1940. She then became a front (operational) boat, also with the 7th Flotilla and set out from Kiel to Trondheim in Norway on her first war patrol on 28 April 1940 in the North Sea.

Based at Kiel
Her first patrol took her to Trondheim and back to Kiel; it was largely uneventful. She sailed again from Kiel on 21 May on a second patrol that was to last 36 days and be highly successful, taking her around the perimeter of the British Isles, to the Western Approaches and the Portuguese coast. On 22 May she sighted an enemy submarine. On the 23rd she again sighted either the original enemy craft or another. A torpedo track was seen, but it passed 50 metres across her bow and she continued her journey. On 29 May, at 16:30 she was spotted and attacked by an aircraft, which dropped two bombs on U-101 as she was west of the English Channel. She suffered minor damage in this attack.

Her first victim was the British merchant ship Stanhall on 30 May. The next day she sank the British Orangemoor, but following this attack she was hunted by convoy escorts for four hours, during which they dropped 34 depth charges. When U-101 risked rising to periscope depth she was spotted by an armed trawler, which dropped another seven depth charges at 22:00, causing some damage. U-101 survived this encounter and went on to sink Polycarp on 2 June. She was attacked again on 4 June at 20.14 hours, this time by an aircraft which dropped a bomb as she sailed west of the English Channel. She escaped damage.

On 11 June she torpedoed and sank the Greek Mount Hymettus and on 12 June she claimed the British Earlspark. The final two successes came when she sank the Greek Antonis Georgandis on 14 June followed by the British Wellington Star on the 16th. Between 12 and 15 June U-101 operated as part of wolfpack Rösing. She was attacked again on 23 June at 04:08 while in the North Sea returning to base, when an aircraft dropped three bombs, damaging the periscope. She returned to Kiel on 25 June.

Based at Lorient
U-101 next patrol was less successful, but still claimed three merchantmen, totalling . She left Kiel on 9 August, passed north of the British Isles and the north-west coast of Ireland and arrived at Lorient in France 39 days later on 16 September. She sank the British Ampleforth on 19 August, the Finnish Elle on 28 August and the Greek Efploia on 1 September. While searching for a convoy west of Ireland on 3 September, she was attacked by an escort with depth charges in five separate efforts, when she suffered considerable damage and began to flood, which was controlled by the crew.

U-101 sailed again on 5 October for a shorter war patrol lasting 20 days. She operated in the North Atlantic, working to intercept convoys sailing to Britain. She sank the Canadian Saint-Malo on 12 October, before being one of a number of U-boats to launch a successful 'wolfpack' attack on Convoy SC 7. She damaged  and sank  on 18 October. While carrying out a final attack she was sighted by one of the merchantmen, which shelled her. She was able to fire her last torpedoes and escape the shells that fell behind her. The merchant ship had turned away and began zig-zagging, and so escaped without being hit. On his return Frauenheim was relieved by Kptlt. Ernst Mengersen.

Under Mengersen
Mengersen undertook one last war patrol during 1940, sailing from Lorient on 24 November. Despite only lasting 14 days, this was another successful voyage. On 31 November the British Aractaca was sunk. The following day U-101 attacked convoy HX 90, sinking the Appalachee and damaging the Loch Ranza on 1 December. The following day she sank a further two ships from the convoy, the Kavak and the Lady Glanely. U-101 returned to Lorient on 7 December having sunk  of shipping and damaged a further .

The boat's next patrol started with her departure from Lorient on 23 January. Despite spending 28 days at sea, this was one of U-101’s less successful cruises. While attempting to attack convoy SC 19 at 04:16 on 29 January, an escorting destroyer fired on her, forcing her to dive. The warship then dropped three depth charges, but these failed to cause any damage. She arrived back at base on 19 February, having accounted for a further  of Allied shipping. She sailed again on 24 March for her longest war patrol, lasting 40 days. This took her deep into the North Atlantic in search of enemy shipping. On 23 April she encountered a British submarine which fired two torpedoes at her, but both missed. U-101 returned to base on 2 May without having sunk or damaged any enemy ships.

Her next patrol began on 28 May and was slightly more successful. While operating further to the south of her previous location, she discovered the convoys OB 327 and 329 and sank the British merchant ships Trecarrell and Trevarrack on 4 and 9 June respectively. Also on 4 June she lost a man, Matrosenobergefreiter Horst Jackl, overboard.

U-101s next patrol took her from Lorient on 7 August. On 24 August at 09:53, she was attacked by an aircraft while off Rockall. Two bombs were dropped but failed to damage her. Nevertheless, U-101 was forced to crash-dive another five times that day and the next to avoid aircraft operating in the area. She then attempted to attack convoy OS-4 on 28 August but was forced to dive by a destroyer at 03:03. She was hunted for three hours by several of the convoy's escorts, which dropped 30 depth charges. Despite the accuracy of these attacks, the only serious damage sustained was a disabled periscope. U-101 put into Saint Nazaire (also on the French Atlantic coast), on 4 September after 29 days at sea during which she had not been able to sink or damage any ships.

Final war patrol
U-101’s final patrol took her from Saint Nazaire back to Kiel around the British Isles once more, departing from her French base on 11 October. While outward bound through the Bay of Biscay on 13 October she was attacked at 10:45 by a twin-engine aircraft. Three bombs were dropped. Some damage must have been visible on the surface as she was attacked again while submerged with a further three bombs at 16:42. She carried out an attack on Convoy SC 48 on 18 October, during which she torpedoed and sank the convoy escort .

She did not have any further success and arrived in Kiel on 16 November having spent 37 days at sea. This marked the end of her active wartime career.

As a training boat and fate
Oberleutnant zur See (Oblt.z.S.) Karl-Heinz Marbach briefly became commander of U-101 on 1 January 1942, serving as such until 3 February. Oblt.z.S. Friedrich Bothe then took over until 31 March. On 1 March U-101 was part of the 26th Flotilla for crew training, until the end of March. Between 1 April and 31 August, she became a training boat for the 21st U-boat Flotilla. On 1 September she joined the 24th Flotilla, again in a training capacity, terminating these duties on 31 August 1943. Between May 1942 and 25 October 1942 she was commanded by Ernst von Witzendorff. He was replaced by Oblt.z.S. Helmut Münster who commanded U-101 until she was decommissioned. She was moved to the 23rd Flotilla on 1 September 1943 until 22 October 1943.

She was then decommissioned at Neustadt. She was laid up until being scuttled on 3 May 1945 prior to the German surrender. The wreck was later broken up.

Wolfpacks
U-101 took part in four wolfpacks, namely:
 Rösing (12 – 15 June 1940)
 West (2 – 20 June 1941)
 Grönland (12 – 27 August 1941)
 Reissewolf (21 – 29 October 1941)

Summary of raiding history

References

Notes

Citations

Bibliography

External links

1940 ships
German Type VIIB submarines
Ships built in Kiel
U-boats commissioned in 1940
World War II submarines of Germany
Operation Regenbogen (U-boat)
Maritime incidents in May 1945